The 1991 Regal Welsh Professional Championship was a professional non-ranking snooker tournament, which took place between 10 and 15 February 1991 at the Newport Centre in Newport, Wales. This was the final edition of the tournament.

Darren Morgan won the tournament defeating Mark Bennett 9–3 in the final.

Main draw

References

Welsh Professional Championship
Welsh Professional Championship
Welsh Professional Championship
Welsh Professional Championship